Shepley, Rutan and Coolidge was a successful architecture firm based in Boston, Massachusetts, operating between 1886 and 1915, with extensive commissions in monumental civic, religious, and collegiate architecture in the spirit and style of Henry Hobson Richardson.

History

The firm grew out of Richardson's architectural practice. After Richardson's death at age 47 in 1886, a trio consisting of George Foster Shepley (1860–1903), Charles Hercules Rutan (1851–1914), and Charles Allerton Coolidge (1858–1936) gained control of the firm and completed all of its nearly two dozen pending projects, including the John J. Glessner House in Chicago. Many of Richardson's projects were completed and modified in stages over years, making exact attribution difficult for such buildings as the Ames Gate Lodge in North Easton, Massachusetts, and even Richardson's masterwork Trinity Church, Boston.

Two of the principals had been educated at the Massachusetts Institute of Technology: Shepley (class of 1882) and Coolidge (class of 1883). Shepley married Richardson's daughter; and Coolidge later married Shepley's sister.

In 1888, the firm was commissioned by Senator and Mrs. Leland Stanford to join landscape architect Frederick Law Olmsted in planning the campus for Stanford University. For major commissions in Chicago and the World's Columbian Exposition, Coolidge moved to Chicago and the firm opened its branch office there in 1893, in which many Prairie School architects received their early professional training, notably Hermann V. von Holst who was head draughtsman. A St. Louis branch office began the career of John Mauran; a Pittsburgh branch office developed into several firms, including Rutan & Russell formed by Frank Rutan, the younger brother of Charles.  Other Pittsburgh firms developed by branch office employees include Longfellow, Alden & Harlow and Frank I. Cooper; Pasadena architect Myron Hunt spent three years with them in Boston as draftsman.

Stylistically, the firm continued to work mainly in the architectural vocabulary of Richardsonian Romanesque, although with less imagination—for instance, Richardson's asymmetry disappears. The firm continued as Shepley Rutan and Coolidge through 1915, then became Coolidge and Shattuck (Boston) and Coolidge and Hodgdon (Chicago) concurrently from 1915 through 1924, then Coolidge Shepley Bulfinch and Abbott from 1924 through 1952, Shepley Bulfinch Richardson and Abbott from 1952, and is still in operation as Shepley Bulfinch.

Work

Conant Hall, Harvard University (1894)
Harvard Medical School campus (1906)
 completion of the Franklin MacVeagh Residence, Chicago (1885–1887), razed 1922
 23 stations for the Boston & Albany Railroad (1886 through 1894):
 Newton Highlands (still standing)
 Chatham, NY (still standing)
 Allston (still standing)
 Newton Lower Falls (located in Wellesley)
 Ashland (still standing)
 Reservoir
 Dalton (still standing)
 Springfield
 Wellesley
 Newton Centre (still standing)
 Huntington
 Warren (still standing)
 Charlton
 Brookline Hills
 Hinsdale
 Canaan, NY
 Millbury
 Riverside
 Longwood
 East Brookfield
 Wellesley Farms (still standing)
 Saxonville
 East Chatham
 Freemason's Hall, Pittsburgh, Pennsylvania (destroyed)
 Bell Telephone Building, St. Louis, Missouri (1889)
 Main Quad, Encina Hall, Leland Stanford Residence, Stanford University, Stanford, California (1886-1906)
 New London Public Library, New London, Connecticut (1889)
 Hartford Union Station, Hartford, Connecticut (1889), executed a design by George Keller
 Shadyside Presbyterian Church, Pittsburgh, Pennsylvania (1890)
 Bell Telephone Building (St. Louis, Missouri) (1890)
 Williams Memorial Institute, New London, Connecticut (1891)
 Montreal Board of Trade Building, Montreal, Quebec (1892), destroyed 1902
 Chicago Public Library (1892), now the Chicago Cultural Center
 Medfield State Hospital, Medfield, Massachusetts (1892)
 Flour and Grain Exchange Building, Boston, Massachusetts (1892)
 Lake Shore & Michigan Southern Station, Sandusky, Ohio (1892)
 North Union Station (1893), razed 1927
 Ames Building, Boston, Massachusetts (1893)
 Art Institute of Chicago (1893), built as the "World's Congress Auxiliary Building" for the World's Columbian Exposition
Completion of Trinity Church, Boston (1894–1897)
 Coraopolis Train Station, Coraopolis, Pennsylvania (1896)
 Glassport P&LE Railroad Station, Glassport, Pennsylvania (ca. 1895-1896)
 New Castle Junction P&LE Railroad Station, New Castle, Pennsylvania (ca. 1895-1896), destroyed
 Guardian Bank Building, Cleveland, Ohio (1896)
 Medill/McCormick Residence, Cantigny Park, Illinois (1896)
 Glenbard West High School, Glen Ellyn, Illinois (1922)
 chapel at the Second Presbyterian Church, St. Louis, Missouri (1896)
 Third St. Joseph County Courthouse, South Bend, Indiana (1897)
 Congregational Library & Archives, Boston (1898)
 South Station (Boston) (1898)
 Albany Union Station, Albany, New York (1899)
 Sedalia Public Library, Sedalia, Missouri (1900)
 Metropolitan Water Board, Chestnut Hill Pump Station, Boston (1900)
 Master plan and more than fifteen buildings for the University of Chicago (1901–1915)
 Manufactures and Liberal Arts Building and Agriculture Building for the Pan-American Exposition, Buffalo, New York (1901)
 Bartlett Gymnasium, University of Chicago, (1904)
 John Carter Brown Library, Brown University, Providence, Rhode Island (1904)
 Hildene, the Robert Todd Lincoln mansion, Manchester, Vermont (1905)
 All Saints Episcopal Church (Appleton, Wisconsin) (1905)
 Langdell Hall, Harvard Law School (1907)
 Corn Exchange Bank Building, also known as National Republican Bank, Chicago, Illinois (1908), razed circa 1985
 additions to Richardson's Hampden County Courthouse, Springfield, Massachusetts (1908–1912)
 Boston Safe Deposit Building, Boston, Massachusetts (1908–1911)
 Union Station in Springfield, Massachusetts (1910)
John Hay Library, Brown University, Providence, Rhode Island (1910)
 Harper Memorial Library, University of Chicago (1910-1912)
 Boston YMCA, Boston, Massachusetts (1911)
 First Congregational Church of Fall River, Fall River Massachusetts (1912)
 Multiple buildings at the University of Nebraska (1914–1925)
 Temple Sholom of Chicago (assisting students at the School of Architecture at Armor Institute).
 Dallas Hall, Southern Methodist University, University Park, Texas (Dallas) (1915)
Ida Noyes Hall, University of Chicago, Chicago, Illinois (1916)
Rockland Railroad Station, Rockland, Maine (1917) (as Coolidge and Shattuck)

Gallery

Sources
 online biography at University of Nebraska
 Lyndon, Donlyn. (1982) The City Observed: Boston, A Guide to the Architecture of the Hub. Vintage Books
 Pridmore, Jay, and Kiar, Peter, The University of Chicago:  an architectural tour
 *
 Ochsner, Jeffrey Karl Ochsner, H.H. Richardson, Complete Architectural Works
 photos of 1890 Bell Telephone Building, St. Louis

References

External links
 

Defunct architecture firms based in Massachusetts
Companies based in Boston
Architects from Boston
Design companies established in 1886
Design companies disestablished in 1915
1886 establishments in Massachusetts
1915 disestablishments in Massachusetts
19th century in Boston
20th century in Boston
Historicist architects
American railway architects